Grêmio Esportivo Bagé, commonly referred to as Bagé, is a Brazilian football club based in Bagé, Rio Grande do Sul. It currently plays in Campeonato Gaúcho Série A2, the second level of the Rio Grande do Sul state football league.

History

Grêmio Esportivo Bagé was founded on August 5, 1920. The club results of the union of two other local teams, the 14 de Julho and Rio Branco.

In relation to the colors, it inherits of Rio Branco the yellow and of the July 14 the black, becoming the traditional gold-black.

Founders
(in alphabetical order)

•Dr. Átila Vinhas
•Dr. Carlos Brasil
•Florêncio Py Lima
•José Maria Parera
•Leonardo Teixeira
•Leonidio Malafaia
•Nélson Osório Ripalda
•Paulino Brandi
•Dr. Sílvio Vinhas
•Dr. Valandro
•Virato Azambuja

The First Management

President: Alípio Pereira Costa

Treasurer: Sargento Osório

Secretary:Austeclino Guaspe

Captain: Rafael Médice

Titles

 Champion of the First Division of 1925
 Champion of the Copa Governador of the State 1974.
 Champion of 2nd Division Gaúcha in 1964, 1982 and 1985.
 Vice-Champion of the State and Champion do Interior, in 1927.
 Vice-Champion of the State and Champion do Interior, in 1928.
 Vice-Champion of the State and Champion Interior, in 1940.
 Vice-Champion of the State and Champion Interior, in 1944.
 Vice-Champion of the State and Champion Interior, in 1957.
 Champion Centenário, in 1957.
 Champion Citadino, in 1922, 1924, 1925, 1927, 1928, 1931, 1932, 1933, 1936, 1939, 1940, 1942, 1944, 1949, 1951, 1952, 1953, 1954, 1955, 1957, 1971, 1975 and 1976.

In 1977 the championship Citadino was discontinued.

Rio Grande do Sul First DivisionRecords

 Currently Bagé participates in the Second Division of the Rio Grande do Sul (since 1995).

Stadium

Name: Pedra Moura
Capacity: 10,000
It was inaugurated in the beginning of the twenties.

The mascot

The mascot is a bee. Chosen  by the colors, but also by the work in group and ferocious attacks.

Rival

Bagé's greatest rival is Guarany. The derby between the clubs is called 'Ba-Gua', and it is played there is more than 85 years.

External links
 Bagé Official Website

Association football clubs established in 1920
Football clubs in Rio Grande do Sul
1920 establishments in Brazil